Tour-en-Sologne (literally Tour in Sologne) is a commune of the Loir-et-Cher department in the administrative region of Centre-Val de Loire, France.

Population

See also
Communes of the Loir-et-Cher department

References

External links
  Tour En Sologne Official site

Communes of Loir-et-Cher